Chithrasalabhangalude Veedu is a 2008 Malayalam language film for children, directed by Krishnakumar.

Plot
Chithrasalabhangalude Veedu tells the story of a boy named Muthu, studying in tenth standard. Muthu is one of the naughtiest boys in the school. He has a gang of friends also. One day he gets arrested  for bringing arrack to school. It was the circumstances  which moulded  the nature of Muthu,  but people never bother  for those  factors and Muthu is always victimized.

Cast
 Ganapathi S Poduval
 Lakshmi Sharma
 Sivaji Guruvayoor
 Manraj
 Gayathri
 Sai Kumar
 Mala Aravindan
 Ambika Mohan
 Manikandan
 T.S.Raju
 Chali Pala
 Shyam Sunder
 Sreenath Ullanat

References

2008 films
2000s Malayalam-language films
Indian children's films
Films shot in Thrissur